Odorado Pirazzoli (6 April 1815 – 30 April 1884) was an Italian army major, engineer and entomologist. He was born in and, excepting his army career, lived in Imola. Pirazzoli was a coleopterist. His collection is in the Museo civico 'G. Scarabelli', Imola.

References

Conci, C. 1975: Repertorio delle biografie e bibliografie degli scrittori e cultori italiani di entomologia.  Mem. Soc. Ent. Ital. 48 1969(4) 817-1069

Italian entomologists
1815 births
1884 deaths